The Men's 56 kg weightlifting event was the lightest men's event at the competition, limiting competitors to a maximum of 56 kilograms of body mass. The competition took place on 4 October at 18:30 and was the second Weightlifting event to conclude. The event took place at the Jawaharlal Nehru Stadium.

Athletes
13 lifters were selected for the games.

Results

See also 
2010 Commonwealth Games
Weightlifting at the 2010 Commonwealth Games

References 

Weightlifting at the 2010 Commonwealth Games